Vattakkali is a dance form seen among the Vattuvar community in the Kerala, India. In this dance participants make extremely fast moves while making vigorous ring forms in tune to the music or song sung by the group. Both men and women participate in the dance. Twelve different types of 'steps' are executed. The beauty of the intricate footwork is heightened by the tinkling of anklets and bells and also by the rhythmic clapping of hand. The whirling movements become faster as the dancing reaches a climax. This dance is performed during the Onam festival season very often. The dance is also called Chuvadukali or Chavittukali.

See also
Dance in India

References

Dances of Kerala
Classical dance genres of India
Arts of Kerala